Rapture in the Chambers is the 12th album by Spirit.

It was their first "proper" album since their 1984 album Spirit of 84, which had featured the entire original line-up. Their albums since that time had mostly consisted of archival releases. It was also their final album for an established label, I.R.S. Records.

The primary line-up for this album was Randy California, Ed Cassidy and John Locke. Mark Andes also appeared on two tracks, and Randy's sister Janet provided harmony vocals on Hard Love and "She-Ra: Princess of Power".

Track listing 
All songs written by Randy California except noted.

Personnel

Spirit 
Randy California – guitars, lead vocals, bass (2–8, 10–12)
John Locke – keyboards, sound effects
Ed Cassidy – drums (all but 1), percussion

Additional personnel
Janet Wolfe – backing vocals
Mark Andes – bass (1, 9)
Curly Smith – drums (1)

Production 
Mike Nile – engineer
Scott Campbell – engineer
Donald Krieger – art direction, design
Rocky Schenck – photography

References 

Spirit (band) albums
1989 albums
I.R.S. Records albums